"Would You Fight for My Love?" is a song by American musician Jack White. It was first released as a promo CD single in Europe on June 30, 2014 and later released to alternative radio stations on August 26 and as a 7-inch single on November 5. The official music video for the song was released on September 12, 2014. "Would You Fight for My Love?" peaked at number 38 on the Billboard Alternative Songs chart.

Music video
The official music video for "Would You Fight for My Love?", lasting four minutes and 20 seconds, premiered on YouTube and Vevo on September 12, 2014. It was directed by Robert Hales and produced by White and Nina Dluhy-Miller.

Track listing

7" vinyl
 Third Man — TMR–291

CD

Charts

Release history

References

2014 singles
2014 songs
Jack White songs
Songs written by Jack White
Third Man Records singles